Gymnopleurus cyaneus is a species of dung beetle found in India, Sri Lanka, Nepal and Pakistan.

Description
This oval, less convex species has an average length of about 8 to 12 mm. The body is metallic green and shiny. There is a blue or violet sheen on the dorsum. Setae are absent in both dorsum and ventrum. The head is slightly rugose, and asperately punctured in front. Clypeus consists with four blunt teeth. Pronotum is smooth, very short, and convex as well as sparsely punctured. In elytra, there are beginnings of deep sulci at the base. Abdominal sides simply carinate at the base. Pygidium with a longitudinal median carina. Male has flat front tibia, whereas female has acute and slender front tibia.

References 

Scarabaeinae
Insects of Sri Lanka
Insects of India
Insects described in 1798